Alejandro "Alejo" González Roig (born 5 January 1907 in Montevideo; died November 1979) was an Uruguayan basketball player who competed in the 1936 Summer Olympics.

Roig was part of the Uruguayan basketball team, which finished sixth in the Olympic tournament. He played all six matches.

References

External links

1907 births
1979 deaths
Basketball players at the 1936 Summer Olympics
Olympic basketball players of Uruguay
Uruguayan men's basketball players
Uruguayan people of Catalan descent
Sportspeople from Montevideo
Place of death missing
Date of death missing
20th-century Uruguayan people